Līksna Station is a railway station serving the village of Līksna in the Latgale region of Latvia. It is located on the Riga–Daugavpils Railway.

References 

Railway stations in Latvia
Augšdaugava Municipality
Railway stations opened in 1861
Latgale